Cryptolechia sciodeta is a moth in the family Depressariidae. It was described by Edward Meyrick in 1930. It is found in Brazil.

The wingspan is about 16 mm. The forewings are yellow-whitish, becoming pale ochreous-yellow towards the termen and the costa narrowly grey to near the apex. The stigmata is grey, the plical obliquely beyond the first discal and there is a small spot of greyish suffusion on the dorsum at one-fourth, as well as an irregular streak of fuscous suffusion along the termen and two dots on the costa before the apex. The hindwings are whitish.

References

Moths described in 1930
Cryptolechia (moth)
Taxa named by Edward Meyrick